Walter Koleznik (born 17 October 1942) is an Austrian footballer. He played in six matches for the Austria national football team from 1963 to 1968.

References

External links
 

1942 births
Living people
Austrian footballers
Austria international footballers
Place of birth missing (living people)
Association footballers not categorized by position
Austrian football managers
Grazer AK players
Grazer AK managers